Spring Films is an independent film production firm founded and managed by actor and film producer Piolo Pascual, director Joyce Bernal and Cornerstone Entertainment president Erickson Raymundo.

About

Spring Films is the recipient of the 49th Guilliermo Mendoza Memorial Scholarship Foundation for 2018. Spring Films was founded by actor-producer Piolo Pascual, filmmaker Joyce E. Bernal, and the company's President Erickson Raymundo. For about a decade, Spring Films has been producing cinema, starting with Kimmy Dora: Kambal Sa Kiyeme that eventually became a popular Filipino trilogy. Their 2017 film Kita Kita (I SeeYou), starring Empoy Marquez and Alessandra de Rossi is considered as the top earning independent Filipino film in history.

Spring Films released its first animated film Hayop Ka! on Netflix from the Philippines, by filmmaker Avid Liongoren in October 2020. In 2021, in partnership once again with Netflix, Spring Films presents to the market Alessandra De Rossi's directorial debut film My Amanda.

Filmography

References

External links

Film production companies of the Philippines
Philippine film studios